Me ei kuolla koskaan is the second studio album by Finnish singer and songwriter Olavi Uusivirta.

Track listing

Charts

Release history

References

2005 albums
Olavi Uusivirta albums
Finnish-language albums